The 1961 Southern Illinois Salukis football team was an American football team that represented Southern Illinois University (now known as Southern Illinois University Carbondale) in the Interstate Intercollegiate Athletic Conference (IIAC) during the 1961 NCAA College Division football season.  Under third-year head coach Carmen Piccone, the team compiled a 7–3 record (5–1 against conference opponents) and won the IIAC championship. The team played its home games at McAndrew Stadium in Carbondale, Illinois.

Schedule

References

Southern Illinois
Southern Illinois Salukis football seasons
Interstate Intercollegiate Athletic Conference football champion seasons
Southern Illinois Salukis football